Hilliard Greene (born February 26, 1958) is an American bassist (playing both double bass, and bass guitar) specializing in modern creative, improvised, and jazz music, as well as a music educator.

Life and work
Hilliard Greene studied at the Berklee College of Music in Boston and at the University of Northern Iowa. He worked as musical director for the singer Jimmy Scott for 20 years. For Cecil Taylor he served as concertmaster for the ensemble Phtongos and played in the trio with pianist Don Pullen. Under his own name, Hill worked with his ensemble, The Jazz Expressions, with whom he recorded three albums; He also played in a quartet with Steve Swell, Gebhard Ullmann, and Barry Altschul. In 2003, Hill released his solo album Alone. He has also appeared on recordings by Dave Douglas (Sanctuary, 1997), Klaus Kugel, Perry Robinson, Charles Gayle (Repent, 1997) and Patrick Brennan.  Hill currently works as a music teacher at the Bass Collective in New York City, where he teaches workshops and master classes in double bass and bass guitar.

Selected discography
As leader
 Alone (Soulsearch Music, 2003)

With The Jazz Expressions
 The Jazz Expressions, Bluejay Records
 Yoyogi, Bluejay Records 
 On The Road, Wildflower Publications

With Jemeel Moondoc
 Cosmic Nickelodeon (Relative Pitch, 2016)

Bibliography
 Richard Cook, Brian Morton: The Penguin Guide to Jazz on CD. 6th edition, London: Penguin, 2002.

External links
 

1958 births
Living people
African-American jazz musicians
American jazz double-bassists
20th-century American bass guitarists
21st-century American bass guitarists
20th-century American double-bassists
21st-century American double-bassists
African-American guitarists
20th-century African-American musicians
21st-century African-American musicians